KTON or kton could refer to:

KTON (AM), a radio station (1330 AM) licensed to serve Cameron, Texas, United States
KTON (defunct), a defunct radio station (940 AM) formerly licensed to serve Belton, Texas, United States
kton, an abbreviation for kiloton